The Terminal Range is the northernmost mountain range of the Canadian Rockies, so-named for its position at the northern terminus of the Rockies.  Lying west of Muncho Lake and the Trout River, its northern perimeter is the Liard River.  The Sentinel Range lies to its east.

See also
Liard River, British Columbia
Toad River Hot Springs Provincial Park
Muncho Lake Provincial Park
Liard River Hot Springs Provincial Park

References

Mountain ranges of British Columbia
Liard Country
Ranges of the Canadian Rockies